Kitana is a fictional character in the Mortal Kombat fighting game franchise by Midway Games and NetherRealm Studios. Debuting in Mortal Kombat II (1993), she is a royal from the fictional realm of Edenia. Her primary weapon is a pair of steel fans, which she uses for most of her special attacks.

The character is introduced as the daughter of Outworld emperor Shao Kahn until she learns her true father was murdered by Shao Kahn when he conquered Edenia. Kitana subsequently becomes a primary hero in the series, joining forces with the Earthrealm warriors as she fights to ensure her realm's liberation. She is also the love interest of Mortal Kombat hero Liu Kang.

One of the franchise's most iconic and popular fighters, Kitana has appeared in various media outside of the games. She has received a positive reception for her appearance, personality, and character development.

Appearances

Mortal Kombat games
Kitana first appears in Mortal Kombat II (1993) as a member of the Edenian race in from the fictional dimension, Outworld. While she is thousands of years old, she more closely resembles a young woman. For most of her life, Kitana believed she was the daughter of Shao Kahn and Queen Sindel. She served as the former's personal elite assassin for centuries, working alongside her sister Mileena and her best friend Jade. Eventually, she found out the truth; Shao Kahn murdered her true father King Jerrod, usurped his throne, and claimed Sindel as his wife to rule over Edenia. He placed Kitana under a spell to make her his loyal daughter and assassin, and had his subordinate Shang Tsung create a disfigured clone of her to be a backup heir. That clone, Mileena, would spy on Kitana and kill and replace her if she ever rose against Shao Kahn. Realizing her life had been a lie, Kitana turned against Shao Kahn and began fighting alongside Earthrealm's champions to defeat the evil emperor and free her home realm of his tyranny. At this point, Kitana started developing a romantic interest in Earthrealm champion Liu Kang. She also came to hate Mileena for being a reminder of the lie she lived and her existing only to kill her. According to the semi-canonical spin-off game Mortal Kombat: Shaolin Monks (2005), after Kitana was found to be no longer loyal to Shao Kahn, she was placed into a spell-induced trance and forced to fight the Earthrealm heroes, Mileena, and Jade before being freed by the Shaolin warrior monks Liu Kang and Kung Lao. Eventually, the sisters clash and Kitana slays Mileena.

During the events of Mortal Kombat 3 (1995), Kitana is put on trial for treason after killing Mileena. Before a verdict and sentence could be reached, however, Kitana escaped (as retconned in MK3 update releases Ultimate Mortal Kombat 3 and Mortal Kombat Trilogy) and joined the warriors of Earthrealm to free Sindel, who had been resurrected and used by Shao Kahn to invade Earth. After convincing Jade to join her, Kitana located and freed Sindel from Shao Kahn's mind control, leading to his defeat at the hands of Liu Kang. Kitana, Sindel, and Jade then liberated Edenia from Outworld.

However, their jubilation was short-lived, as during the events of Mortal Kombat Gold (1999), fallen Elder God Shinnok and his grand vizier Quan Chi escaped imprisonment in the Netherrealm and invaded Edenia. Betrayed by the traitorous Edenian Tanya, Kitana, Sindel, and Jade are taken prisoner, but Kitana manages to escape and rejoin her Earthrealm allies and eventually defeat Shinnok's forces. With Edenia freed once again, Kitana proposes to Liu Kang, offering him the chance to rule Edenia by her side as King and Queen, but he reluctantly rejects her offer; seeing his true duty as being Earth's champion. After Shinnok's defeat, Kitana captures Mileena, but learns that Shao Kahn had survived his defeat in Earthrealm and was reamassing power. Knowing that the Kahn would attempt to reclaim Edenia once he was strong enough, she forged an alliance with Goro, prince of the Outworld race Shokan, against the Kahn's forces.

In Mortal Kombat: Deadly Alliance (2002), Kitana led a preemptive strike against Shao Kahn's forces, only to learn that he had been slain by unknown assassins. Believing her fight was over, she began the journey back to Edenia, but encountered Kung Lao, who warned her that Quan Chi and Shang Tsung had formed an alliance to kill Liu Kang and Shao Kahn before attempting to revive Onaga the Dragon King. Despite Kitana's grief, she rejoined the Earthrealm warriors and led them into battle. During the assault on Shang Tsung's palace, she faced Quan Chi, but is outmatched and killed alongside her allies. Shortly afterward, they were resurrected and magically enslaved by Onaga, who sent Mileena to impersonate Kitana as the princess of Edenia.

In Mortal Kombat: Deception (2004), Onaga used Kitana to defeat and imprison Sindel. She was freed by Jade, and together they flee to Outworld to find a way to defeat Onaga and free Kitana from his influence. Unbeknownst to anyone at the time, Liu Kang's spirit was able to remain amongst the living due to the bond he shared with Kitana. He found himself a new ally and friend in Ermac, as the two embarked on a mission to save their allies as well, and eventually succeeded. While traveling back to Edenia, Kitana encountered Blaze, who warned her of a coming danger that threatens all the realms and advised her to assemble the forces of light to avert it. Weary of the constant battle, Kitana was disheartened, but Blaze assured her that the wars would soon be over.

Following this warning, Kitana returned in Mortal Kombat: Armageddon (2006), accompanied by Liu Kang's spirit in order to keep him whole until she found a way to reunite him with his body. They later met with Nightwolf, who offered to relieve Kitana of her burden by taking Liu Kang's soul into himself, allowing her to fight against the coming evil. Kitana ultimately perished alongside the rest of her allies during the battle.

In the non-canonical crossover game Mortal Kombat vs. DC Universe (2008), Kitana was transported to Metropolis, where she encountered Wonder Woman. As she was suffering from "kombat rage" at the time, Kitana hallucinated Wonder Woman as an assassin sent from Outworld and challenged her. After being defeated, Kitana fled to a different section of Metropolis, where she was found and defeated by Scorpion and brought to Raiden's temple, where she reveals she had a vision of Shao Kahn fusing with a being called Darkseid to become Dark Kahn. Following this, Kitana joined the rest of the combatants in traveling to the fused realms of Outworld and Apokolips and fighting the DC Universe's heroes and villains while Raiden and Superman battled and destroyed Dark Kahn.

In the rebooted timeline of Mortal Kombat (2011), which retells the events of the first three Mortal Kombat games, she and Jade are sent by Shao Kahn to compete in a Mortal Kombat tournament. Kitana battles Liu Kang in an attempt to ensure that he will not reach the final stages of the first tournament, but is defeated. Expecting to die, she is surprised by his decision to spare her. Later, during the second tournament, Kitana is approached by Raiden, who informs her that her supposed past as Shao Kahn's daughter is a lie. Plagued by doubts, she infiltrated Shang Tsung's flesh pits and discovered the newly created Mileena. Before the Kahn, she accuses Shang Tsung of attempting to replace her, but is shocked to learn that the Emperor himself ordered Mileena's creation. He imprisoned Kitana in the palace, prior to an execution, and commands his "true daughter" to be brought to him. Kitana is soon freed by Liu Kang, and she and Jade escape to Earthrealm to join their new allies against Outworld's forces. They assist in the battle for Earthrealm, but are killed alongside several other warriors by Kitana's corrupted mother, Sindel. In the end, she is shown to be one of the warriors that were resurrected by Quan Chi in the Netherrealm to battle Raiden.

In Mortal Kombat X (2015) Kitana returns as one of Quan Chi's revenants. She fought Jax and Cassie Cage in the game's story mode. Following Quan Chi's death and Shinnok's defeat, she and fellow revenant Liu Kang became the Netherrealm's new rulers.

In Mortal Kombat 11 (2019), Kitana's revenant aligned herself with the keeper of time Kronika after the latter promised her a timeline without Raiden. As a result of Kronika's actions however, a past version of Kitana and Liu Kang were brought to the present. While he traveled to Earthrealm to find out more about what happened, she stayed in Outworld to find Shao Kahn, who had also been brought to the present. To aid the new Outworld emperor Kotal Kahn, Kitana forged alliances with Outworld's disparate factions before leading them into battle against Shao Kahn; personally defeating and maiming him herself. Kotal, who had been crippled during the fight, appointed Kitana the new Kahn of Outworld in recognition of her skills in combat and diplomacy. After Kronika kidnaps Liu Kang, Kitana and her Outworld army aided Earthrealm's allied forces against Kronika's army until Raiden merged with Liu Kang's past self and his revenant to become Fire God Liu Kang. As the rest of her allies fought off Kronika's forces, Kitana joined Liu Kang in breaching Kronika's keep. However, Kronika reverses time for everyone except Liu Kang, who faces her and his allies' revenants alone. In one of the game's endings, Liu Kang defeats Kronika and is able to bring Kitana back to help him forge a new timeline. In the DLC story expansion Aftermath, Kitana was reunited with Sindel after a time-traveling Shang Tsung and Fujin resurrected her to help in the fight against Kronika. However, she was horrified to learn of her mother's true megalomaniacal nature when she failed to stop her from betraying Earthrealm and Outworld.

Design history and derived characters

In 2009, Kitana's origins were revealed by her creator, John Tobias, who disclosed that she started out as an unplayable herald-type character called "Kitsune" during the early development of the original Mortal Kombat game in 1991; his inspiration at the time was the character of Princess Mariko from Jordan Mechner's 1984 video game Karateka. In Tobias' design sketch, Kitsune wielded a single ornamental fan and "was going to fit into the story as Shang Lao's [early Shang Tsung] princess daughter—the spoil of victory for winning the tournament" who would betray her father after she fell for Liu Kang. Shang instead became a minion of Shao Kahn when the story was expanded for Mortal Kombat II, for which Kitsune was renamed "Kitana" and made Kahn's stepdaughter keeping up with the princess character idea. According to Tobias, her original name was rejected for being Japanese and thus not compatible with "Shang and Shao who were both Chinese in origin" (before the games "ultimately became a hodgepodge of nonsensical Asian mythological hooha anyway"), and the name Kitana was created as "a combo of Kitsune & Katana" that would sound "generically Asian enough." During the reworking of Kitsune, Tobias drew her brandishing sais, and when he presented the sketches to co-creator and producer Ed Boon, he suggested that the character could earn a duplicate through palette swapping, and thus Tobias conceived a twin, Mileena, that would inherit the sais while Kitana would instead brandish bladed fans.

Boon said Kitana's iconic "Kiss of Death" (or "Kiss of Doom") Fatality was inspired by the demise of the villain Mr. Big (Dr. Kananga) in the 1973 James Bond film Live and Let Die, adding that it was his favorite finishing move of MKII and one of the best examples of their attempt to combine violent and humorous elements in the game. Her Ultimate Mortal Kombat 3 / Trilogy Animality transformation animal is a small killer rabbit in a homage to Monty Python and the Holy Grail, and a cutscene of her non-canonical ending in the Mortal Kombat 2011, in which she forms an alliance with Jade and Mileena, is a reference to Charlie's Angels. Besides the "Kiss of Death", Kitana's other most commonly recurring Fatality is an execution through decapitation with a bladed fan, which has been featured in almost all of her game appearances (except of Mortal Kombat: Deadly Alliance and Mortal Kombat vs. DC Universe) and is expanded in Mortal Kombat 2011 where she cuts off the defeated opponents' arms before beheading them. During the early 1990s, there has been a popular yet completely false rumor regarding the supposed Nudality (or Sexuality), a unique finishing move to use either by or against Kitana and Mileena.

Boon described Kitana and Mileena as the female equivalents of Scorpion and Sub-Zero, the series' two most iconic male characters with a fierce rivalry of their own. Speaking in 2009, Boon said Kitana had become of the most recognizable Mortal Kombat characters, alongside Scorpion, Sub-Zero, and the series' official protagonist Liu Kang. Prior to the release of Mortal Kombat X, the game's lead designer John Edwards said Kitana had remained his favorite character.

Kitana was originally portrayed by karate and taekwondo practitioner Katalin Zamiar. She was hired for the role after Boon and Tobias, who have been members of her fitness center, were contacted by her brother, a Mortal Kombat fan who proposed that she would take a role in the sequel. Zamiar said she was introduced to them through Johnny Cage's actor, Daniel Pesina, "when they decided they wanted to cast a female martial artist for the ninja roles." She trained in kung fu for the first time in preparation for the role. Though Kitana returned for UMK3, Zamiar did not reprise the role due to legal issues with Midway Games and was replaced by Becky Gable. Karen Strassman, who voiced Kitana in the 2011 reboot, reprised the role for the story mode of Mortal Kombat X, with Grey DeLisle performing in-gameplay voice work for the character.

Up until Mortal Kombat Gold, Kitana, Mileena and Jade all wore a common costume design in each game, differing from each other through palette swapping (purple for Mileena and green for Jade) to create their digitized sprite graphics. Katalin Zamiar's outfit used for all three female ninja characters of MKII was Kitana's blue. It was a tailor-made, swimsuit-based simple costume that, however, presented some challenges for the crew during filming. For UMK3, Becky Gable was videotaped in a more revealing outfit, which this time was red to stand out from the blue screen more. Both of these "classics" returned as optional costumes in MK2011. Kitana first appeared unmasked in her 3D graphics model in Gold. In Deception, Kitana appears in the endings for Sindel and Ermac, resembling an unmasked and blue-clad version of Mileena from this game. Kitana's main costume in MKX, notably less skimpy than usual, was created to be different than it has been in the previous games. Her alternative costume in MKX is more in the style of her previous outfits.

Besides Mileena and Jade in Mortal Kombat II and Khameleon in Mortal Kombat Trilogy, another character, Tanya, who was introduced in Mortal Kombat 4, also began as a recolored version of Kitana with altered moves. Another character derived from Kitana is the crimson code-colored female ninja Skarlet, who was first rumored to be an Ermac-style glitch character and debuted as a playable in MK2011. The moveset of Sonya Blade in Mortal Kombat 3 is very similar to Kitana's in MKII.

Kitana's official measurements in Deadly Alliance are 128 lb. weight and 5'9" height. Her weapon of choice is a pair of razor-edged steel fans, inspired by Japanese war fans and originally being fully metal. Kitana's fans during the production of MKII were not actually steel but made of a reflective paper material, and were Zamiar's own training fans. Following her MKII debut, Kitana was repeatedly removed from further sequels due to various circumstances, only to always return in a port or an update, as it was the case with UMK3/Trilogy after her absence in MK3, Gold after her absence in MK4, and Mortal Kombat: Unchained after her absence in Deception. In Gold, Kitana uses a throwing weapon, the "Flying Blade", which is similar to Tanya's sharp boomerang due to the two characters' linked development history in the original version of MK4. In MKX, Kitana can use either her own weapons or those of Jade from previous games: a telescoping staff, and a glaive throwing blade that is guidable in midflight.

Most of Kitana's traditional special moves utilize her twin fan weapons, used as a melee weapon, as a thrown projectile, and to lift her enemies in the air. In later games, Kitana received some special moves that have been typically associated with Mileena, such as a ground-roll attack in vs. DC Universe and teleportation-based moves since Shaolin Monks. Like all playable characters in Mortal Kombat X, Kitana has three different style variations to choose from in this game, including her "Mournful" variation using Jade's special attacks such as "Shadow Kick" and weapons. Her other MKX styles are the aggressive, fast and acrobatic Assassin, and the defensively-oriented Royal Storm, which expands on her fan-lifting abilities.

Gameplay
Kitana was chosen as the best Mortal Kombat II fighter by the editors of Sega Power and Super Play for being "good all around" and due to her quick attacks and perceived similarities to Chun-Li.<ref name=ap>"True Stories: Mortal Kombat 2". Amiga Power 44] (December 1994), pages 10-11.</ref> Amiga Power too called her "a really good character to pick" and Cinema Blend stated Kitana "could absolutely dominate" the game. However, GamePro's strategy guide ranked Kitana as only the seventh best of the 12 fighters in MKII (citing her devastating combos, powerful "Fan Throw" move, and good sweep and reach hindered by slow release of the fan-based special moves and limited attack patterns); it was her clone Mileena who landed on the top of their chart. According to a retrospective by Complex, Kitana "had the most powerful projectile attack, and along with Mileena, the fastest throws and sweeps." "Kitana's big combos in the corner" were among Ed Boon's own personal favourite things in the game: "When I saw people do Kitana's combos I knew there was something special, because people were taking the game to a new direction." EGM described Kitana as "a force to be reckoned with" and predicted she would "make a big impact as her Fan Wave leaves foes open to combos." In the Game Gear version of MKII, however, Kitana's fan lifts the opponent too low and too far away for an easy combo.

Kitana's combo abilities were severely downgraded for Ultimate Mortal Kombat 3 (and, by extension, Mortal Kombat Trilogy), for which she received no new special moves unlike most of the other characters. According to Nintendo Power, "with such a small repertoire, Princess Kitana will be sorely challenged by experienced warriors," even as her fan toss is faster than many other projectile attacks. Sega Saturn Magazine opined that "Kitana's lack of enhancements doesn't make her as exciting to play as some of the other characters, though her excellent juggle combos still work - and they can do loads of damage," According to Total 64, "her moves are a little unfriendly and her combos are a touch difficult." EGM Strategy Guide for UMK3 stated: "She had deadly corner traps with damage in up to 90 percent [in MKII]. Now, her fan-raise combos have been severely crippled to almost not being worth it." Nevertheless, X360 called the CPU Kitana "the worst possible character to come up against" in the single-player Tower mode of UMK3, as she is "fast, impossible to sweep, and capable of rendering any opponent incapable with a waft of her fan." According to Dreamcast Magazine, Mortal Kombat Golds returning "old favourites like Sub-Zero, Kitana and Baraka" too had by then "dated moves and fatalities." Her combos improved in the later games, and according to BradyGames' official guide for Mortal Kombat: Deadly Alliance, "Kitana stays at the top of the heap as far as kombatants go. In any stance, she can pump out over 30% with relative ease, making her one of the deadliest in the hands of a beginner or a master." Kitana was later found to be capable of infinite-loop corner combos in her "Mournful" variation in Mortal Kombat X.

In Mortal Kombat: Shaolin Monks, Kitana is fought as a boss character twice in the game's main story mode and is one of unlockable player characters for the versus mode. Prima Games' guide to Shaolin Monks states she is "quick enough for moderate damage, and has some of the most potent special moves in the game," but her limitation is she needs to be fighting at close range to make use of it. Regarding Mortal Kombat: Armageddon, however, Prima declared Kitana "a tough character to win with" and "like many of the other low tier character types, she's lacking in almost every aspect" (even as she "is a little better on defense than she is on offense"). She was rated overall only 4/10 for this game. Their official guide for Mortal Kombat vs. DC Universe, on the other hand, called her "one of the more dangerous characters in the game due to her speed and extremely effective move-set." Prima's official guide for 2011's Mortal Kombat deemed Kitana a capable fighter who once again "is at her deadliest in the corner" and is also especially good if played against Baraka and Cyber Sub-Zero. Prima observed Kitana in MK2011 as her "cheapest" (unduly overpowered) incarnation so far, stating "Kitana is not only one of the most damaging characters in the game, but in addition to the Fan Lift and Square Wave Punch, she can combo her Air Fan almost any time an opponent is airborne." According to Prima's guide to MKX, "Kitana is one of the more unique characters in the game" due to her inheriting many of Jade's special moves, and she "is a zoning character at heart, but she can play offensively or defensively" depending on a variation chosen. The guide recommended the "Mournful" variant for former Jade players, and the "Assassin" variant, which "tries to take the generally defensive style Kitana has in MKX and add some offensive firepower to it," for veteran Kitana players.

Other media
Kitana appears in Malibu Comics's 1994-1995 Mortal Kombat comic book series. She first appears during the 1994 three-issue miniseries Goro: Prince of Pain, joining Mileena, Baraka and Reptile in searching for Goro in Outworld. During the Battlewave miniseries, she attempts to rebel against Kahn with the assistance of Kung Lao, Baraka and Sub-Zero. Kitana's enemies besides Mileena include Scorpion, who offers to take her as his new wife. She is the subject of a one-shot issue titled Kitana and Mileena: Sister Act, in which her royal background from the games is intact, only she is already an adult when Shao Kahn kills Jerrod and seizes the realm, before putting her under a spell that makes her forget her past life and instead believe she is Kahn's daughter. Unlike in the game series' continuity, in the comic series Kitana has no interactions with neither Liu Kang nor Jade; instead, she has a closer relation with Kung Lao (Shang Tsung even attempts to exploit this while taking Kitana's form). In the official comics, Kitana has a small part in Midway's Mortal Kombat 4 prologue comic book published in 1997 and released with the PC version of the game, in which she arranges peace between the warring Shokan and Centaurian races, and appears in the 2008 tie-in comic Mortal Kombat vs. DC Universe: Beginnings, illustrated John Tobias and published by DC Comics in 2008.

Despite being a major character in the video games' storyline, Princess Kitana was only a supporting character in both Mortal Kombat live-action films. In the movies, Kitana was portrayed by Talisa Soto (who was one of the only two actors, along with Robin Shou, to play the same character in both films), who was unmasked and wore less revealing, all-black costumes; namely, a corset top, leggings, knee-high boots and opera-length gauntlets (and occasionally, a full-length sequined gown). In the 1995 first film, Kitana is introduced as a companion of Shang Tsung, who is aware that she is a dangerous adversary due to her being the rightful heir of Outworld and may attempt to ally herself with the Earth fighters, and he therefore sends Reptile to spy on Kitana. She eventually joins Liu Kang and the Earthrealm warriors to help them defeat the sorcerer. According to producer Lauri Apelian, "with Talisa and Bridgette [Wilson], we had two characters that were well rounded. I didn't want the women to be cardboard characters. They needed to have a strength and an independence and an intellect that went well beyond their beauty and being sexy." In the 1995 novelization of the first Mortal Kombat film by Martin Delrio, based in part on the early scripts by Kevin Droney, Shang Tsung informs Goro that Kitana "alone keeps alive the memory" of the Outworld throne before Kahn's conquest and "uses her age and her position as a shield to cover her rebellion." Kitana spends most of the 1997 sequel Mortal Kombat: Annihilation in Kahn's captivity after being captured by Scorpion, before she faces Sindel during the final battle. Kitana was supposed to appear in the third film as well.

Kitana's steel folding fans (redesigned into several individual blades instead of solid all-metal) appear once as her weapon in the films, though she fights with them closed. While Annihilation teases a romantic relationship between Kitana and Liu Kang, her background in both films consists only of her being the rightful heir to the Outworld throne. They do kiss at the end of Annihilation, and their kiss was actually supposed to be included in the first film too but the director Paul W. S. Anderson did not like it. The actress Talisa Soto-Bratt, who said she "loved" the character for Kitana's "incredible strength" and for the challenge this role posed for her, said that was while first preparing for her role she was "educated" about it by her nieces and nephews. She then underwent five weeks of martial arts training in tai chi chuan and wing chun, while her further role in Annihilation required her to learn Brazilian stick fighting for the use of fans.

Princess Kitana is a main character in the 1996 television animated series Mortal Kombat: Defenders of the Realm, a loose adaptation of Mortal Kombat 3 influenced by the film, where she is voiced by Cree Summer. In the series, Kitana in brown-haired and almost always unmasked, wearing a black costume mixing her outfits in Mortal Kombat II and Ultimate Mortal Kombat 3. Like in the first film, no reference is made to any past loyalty to Kahn. Sean Catherine Derek's Writer Guide document for the show, as well as the official character guide, describe Kitana as an "exotic", "gorgeous and outrageously sexy" woman, who is "extremely mysterious" as she "often speaks in mystical riddles." The guides also note "a strong bond and major heat" between her and Liu Kang, and that "though she is incredibly feminine, Kitana is a fierce warrior." In the episode "Skin Deep", Rain is introduced as her former love interest turned enemy, though neither have ever shared any relationship in the series canon other than their Edenian heritage. In the episode "Swords of Ilkan", Kitana defeats her former ally named Zara, an original character. The episode "Abandoned" features a ninja girl named Ruby, a friend of Kitana (a reworking of Jade). The final episode "Overthrown" involves Kitana leading an unsuccessful rebellion against Shao Kahn's Outworld rule.

Kitana is a recurring character in the 1998 live-action television series Mortal Kombat: Conquest, played by Audie England in two episodes ("Vengeance" and "Shadow of a Doubt") and once by Dara Tomanovich ("The Essence"), with Christine Rodriguez serving as their stunt double. In this series, she is fully aware of her Edenian past and the deaths of her parents at Kahn's hands, clandestinely working with Kung Lao to prevent the Emperor from conquering realms while at the same time feigning her allegiance to him. Her outfit and weapon are resembling these she has in the films, but she uses her native Edenian fighting style which she had mastered already before Shao Kahn's invasion and which was supplemented with various moves that she learnt from prisoners of her stepfather. The Konquest version of Mileena is neither her clone nor a sister but just someone who impersonates her to seduce and assassinate Kung Lao, and Rain appears as Kitana's former best friend. In the series finale, which ended in a cliffhanger due to the show's abrupt cancellation after two seasons, Kitana appears to die after she is reluctantly ordered by Shao Kahn to be killed for plotting against him. She is promptly attacked by Shadow Priests and one of them uses Kitana's own fan against her.

Kitana was featured in a two-part episode in the 2011 prequel live-action webisode series Mortal Kombat: Legacy. Kitana was played by martial artist and stuntwoman Samantha Win (credited as Sam Tjhia) in her acting debut. Jo, a self-professed Kitana fan since her childhood, said that while preparing for the role she had done research "to get on the same page" with fans to see how they perceive Kitana. She said that the hardest part for her was "to understand the sibling rivalry and betrayal that Kitana faced in her past, and how it deeply affected the character she is now." Kitana's origin is told in part-live and part-animated episode "Kitana & Mileena", which is an altered adaptation of their backstory from the original game series' canon. In a notable difference, her mother Sindel uses a ritual so her soul fuses with Kitana's in hopes to avoid Shao Kahn's corruption before committing suicide. Kitana appears both masked (only in the animated scenes) and unmasked, and bests Mileena in a fierce sparring match. When the young sisters are sent by Shao Kahn to assassinate the man who is really King Jerrod, Kitana's biological father who is killed by Mileena, Kitana eventually learns the truth after her past and decides to turn against Shao Kahn in the upcoming Mortal Kombat tournament. Kitana returned for the second season of Legacy in 2013, still played by Sam Jo but in a new costume. In the second season, Kitana comes to rescue of Johnny Cage by fighting and defeating Mileena, whom she decapitates.

Kitana was among several characters featured in the 1995 stage show Mortal Kombat: Live Tour, where she was played by Lexi Alexander (credited as Lexi Mirai)Black Belt Vol. 41, No. 6 (June 2003). and Jennifer DeCosta. Kitana, played by Dana Hee, was also featured in Threshold Entertainment's abortive web show Mortal Kombat: Federation of Martial Arts in 2000–2001, where she fought against Johnny Cage and Scorpion before the show was canceled.

Kitana appears in Mortal Kombat Legends: Scorpion's Revenge, voiced by Grey DeLisle. She appears in the film dueling with Liu Kang during the Mortal Kombat tournament. DeLisle reprised her role in the sequel Mortal Kombat Legends: Battle of the Realms.

While she didn't appear in Mortal Kombat, one of Kitana's fans appears in Raiden's temple.

Merchandise and promotion
Model Rachelle Glover dressed as Kitana, along with others dressed as Sonya and Mileena, was featured in her a 2011 live-action trailer "Kitana Kasting" and an official photo session; all three of them later attended The Gadget Show: World Tour for a MK game tournament. Glover also portrayed Kitana in 2012's "Play Anywhere", a live-action trailer for the PlayStation Vita version of Mortal Kombat, first in two teaser trailers and then in the full version with both of them mixed together. Also to promote MK2011, UFC's Octagon Girl Brittney Palmer dressed up in a blue costume and played as Kitana in the game in a Playboy vlog. AJ Lee dressed up as Kitana on a WWE Raw Halloween Divas Battle Royale. Velvet Sky dressed up as Kitana for Impact Wrestling's Halloween photoshoot along with Gail Kim as Mileena.

A figurine of Kitana came in the MKII set with the Argentinian magazine Top Kids in 1995. An action figure of Kitana was released in the UK by Toy Island as part of their 1996 Mortal Kombat Trilogy series. Another action figure of Kitana, this time in her MKX "Royal Storm" variation, was released by Mezco Toyz in 2015 and a Funko Pop! figure was released in 2017 followed by a more realistic Funko action figure, both also of the "Royal Storm". A 1/6-scale limited-edition statue of Kitana from MK2011 was released by Syco Collectibles in the Enchanted Warriors series in 2012. A 1/4 scale statue by Pop Culture Shock Collectibles was released in 2013, including an unmasked limited edition. A 1/3 scale statue of Kitana from MKX was released by Pop Culture Shock in 2018. Besides figures, some of them unreleased, there have been also a number of other Kitana-themed merchandise items.Cultural impact
Kitana appeared in two issues of the humor magazine Cracked (in which she was renamed "Princess Kittykat") and in Grant Ginder's 2009 novel This Is How It Starts. The video-game versions of wrestlers The Bella Twins in the 2015 game WWE Immortals were dressed in costumes inspired by Mileena and Kitana. Musician Princess Nokia (Destiny Nicole Frasqueri), who named Kitana as her favourite female game character, made a 2017 song titled "Kitana".

Since the early 1990s, the character has been a widely popular subject of cosplay both in the United States and abroad, particularly among models and entertainers. For instance, Filipina presenter and 2010 FHM "Premiere Vixen" winner Karen Bordador dressed up as Kitana for a 2011 photo session, bodybuilder Tanya Jordan won the Ms. Fitness Southern California 2010 competition by pole dancing in a Kitana costume, film maker Jen Soska dressed as Kitana to fight her sister Sylvia's Mileena at Fantastic Fest 2011, and dancers from the Miami Northwestern Senior High School dressed in Kitana for a controversial dance routine in 2017. In the world of martial arts, professional wrestler AJ Lee (April Jeanette Mendez) dressed as Kitana for the Divas Battle Royal contest in the Halloween 2011 special edition of Monday Night Raw, during which she jokingly attempted to perform a "Fan Lift" on her opponent, and mixed-martial artist Roxanne Modafferi dressed as Kitana for Ultimate Fighting Championship's Friday's Invicta FC 14 official weigh-in in 2015. Other personalities who costumed themselves as the character have included Maxim model Aja Dang at ComicCon 2012, model Jenn Sterger in 2013, professional wrestler Velvet Sky (Jamie Lynn Szantyr) in 2014, singer Demi Lovato in 2017, and singer and actress Teyana Taylor in 2018. In the 2014 sixth season of RuPaul's Drag Race, contestant Adore Delano wore a costume of Kitana who she said was her favorite Mortal Kombat character.

"Kitana" has become an occasional neologistic misspelling of the word "katana." Though the name itself has no distinct meaning and did not exist before being made-up by Tobias for MKII in 1993, it is now a given name being in use in the United States and elsewhere. "Kitana Jade" has been the alias of American adult model Cherie Roberts since 1999, Kitana Baker is the adopted name of an American model born Christi Josenhans, and Kitana Kiki Rodriguez is a name taken by an American transgender actress. It is also the name of a character in Derek Landy's 2012 novel Skulduggery Pleasant: Kingdom of the Wicked. 

Reception
Critical reactions and popularity
Critical reception of Kitana has been mostly very positive, often with emphasis placed on her good looks and sometimes on her relatively complicated personality. She has become commonly regarded to be one of the most recognizable characters of the Mortal Kombat franchise. Mortal Kombat II was described by CU Amiga as "Kitana & Co" and by GamePro as "Kitana and crew"Slasher Quan, GamePro issue 63 (October 1994), page 41. and Total 64 called Kitana the "babe" of Mortal Kombat Trilogy, saying that her gameplay problems "all can be forgiven when we look at those legs." Criticizing characters of the game War Gods, made by the same team as Mortal Kombat, Computer and Video Games used Kitana as an example of a contrasting "awesome" character. According to Tom's Hardware in 2007, "Kitana is arguably the best known and most popular woman in the Mortal Kombat series." She placed fourth on the 2005 list of top "old school" Mortal Kombat characters by Game Revolution's Anthony Severino, ranked as the fifth top character in the series by Robert Workman of GamePlayBook in 2010, and was voted the ninth top Mortal Kombat fighter by the staff of UGO in 2012. Fans voted Kitana the series' twelfth-greatest character in a 2013 fan-voted poll by Dorkly that rated the entire Mortal Kombat roster. Mixed martial artist Ronda Rousey named Kitana as her favourite Mortal Kombat character. Actresses Natalie Martinez and Megan Fox both said that their dream role would be to play Kitana in a movie.

At the time of her introduction, Times Union described Kitana as "the sexy and vicious fighter" and "a killer babe who melds a mix of seduction and violence." According to Amiga Format in 1994, while it might be "incredibly sad for adult males to fancy in game female characters," one should be "prepared to fall in love" with Kitana. The Austin American-Statesman described Kitana and Mileena as "far nastier than that martial-artless aerobics instructor from the first game." According to Joey Esposito of MTV, "it's obvious that Mortal Kombat II added in some more, let’s say, sexually suggestive characters in Mileena and Kitana." One of the many false rumors surrounding the game at the time concerned a supposed "Nudality" (or "Sexuality") finishing move that would be performed by Kitana stripping naked. Years later, in 2004, Vibe's Stud Houston admitted he had a crush on Kitana, describing her as "sexy as hell," and MTV Multiplayer's Kendra Beltran chose Kitana as the number one female character on her 2013 list of "video game crushes you had as a kid". The relationship between the "smoking hot" Kitana and Liu Kang was ranked as the fourth best video game couple by the staff of IGN in 2006. Rob Wright of Tom's Games included this "enduring and powerful character" on his 2007 list of the 50 greatest female characters in video game history for being a "powerful princess that's lived more than 10,000 years and still hasn't lost her hotness," X360 featured her on the list of "an alternative top ten females in gaming" in 2009, and James Hawkins of Joystick Division ranked her as the fifth top "badass lady" in video games in 2010. VideoGamer.com's Wesley Yin-Poole included Princess Kitana on his 2010 list of top ten "video game crushes" as rivaling Princess Peach for number one video game monarch and winning out "in sheer sex appeal." Danny Gallagher of MTV's Guy Code ranked Kitana as the fourth "best babe in video games" of 2011, stating that she not only has "a great pair of long legs" but also "the deepest emotional core of any of the Mortal Kombat characters." GameRevolution included Kitana in their list of ten best female characters in 2016.

Sex appeal
Kitana has quickly become one of the Mortal Kombat series' sex symbols, in a display of what one author described as manifestation of "pseudo-Japanese Orientalist fetishes." She has been featured in many lists of all gaming's most attractive female characters by various foreign publications, including as one of the 20 "muses" of video games by Brazilian magazine SuperGamePower in 2001, and one of the 21 "sexy ladies of computer games" by Poland's Fakt in 2009. In 2008, GameDaily ranked her as the 28th top "hottest game babe", noting her as "the most worthy of the Mortal Kombat II babes," while UGO similarly ranked her as the 28th top "videogame hottie", and GamesRadar featured her on the list of top 20 supposedly overlooked "game babes". In 2009, Complex featured her as one of top ten "hottest video game girls", calling her "the sexiest cougar ever." In 2011, Anurag Ghosh and Bill Fulks at Bright Hub named "the gorgeous Kitana" as the sexiest Mortal Kombat character, while GameFront's Ross Lincoln ranked her bust in the new game as the 30th-finest in gaming history. In 2012, Kitana was declared the second-sexiest character in video games by Fernando DaQuino of TecMundo, who noted her being "well far from a princess stereotype," and included among the 20 "hottest women" in video game history by MSN Malaysia. UGO ranked her as the "38th-hottest fictional woman" of the year, commenting that the Mortal Kombat series "has always boasted some hotties, but the new game brought back Kitana in a big way." Kitana was rated as the seventh-sexiest "video game girl" by Nixie Pixel of Revision3, and João Vitor de Oliveira from Brazilian edition of Official Xbox Magazine placed her fifth on his list of sexiest women in fighting games. In 2013, Kitana was also ranked as the fifth-sexiest female video game character of all time by AMOG's Albert Costill, who referred to her as "not only one of the most recognizable characters from Mortal Kombat," but "also one of the coolest, and definitely sexiest," as well as the second-sexiest female video game character by Scarlet Clearwater of Soletron. Kitana was ranked as the 56th-best-looking game woman by Brazilian site GameHall's Portal PlayGame in 2014, with a comment that since her first appearance she "has stirred imagination of MK players and gained fans around the world." In 2015, Indonesian television station Liputan 6 ranked her as the eighth-sexiest Oriental woman character in video games.

She has drawn comparisons to the series' first female character, Sonya Blade. Kitana tied for eighth with Sonya in Complex's 2010 list of the "hottest women in video games." In 2010, during development of the Mortal Kombat reboot, God of War series director David Jaffe explicitly wrote how his character Kratos would have "a FUCKALITY" with "Sonya AND " if he joined the series (Jaffe later explained that he does not advocate rape, as it was interpreted by some, and that his comment was to suggest that Kratos would "get a threesome" as a reward). In 2012, Kitana was ranked as the second-top "hottest" female video game character by Kristie Bertucci of Gadget Review, who called her "way hotter" than Sonya. That same year, JoBlo.com placed Kitana ninth on their list of the ten "hottest video game characters," likewise stating that Sonya "had nothing on her" and calling her a "videogame babe for the ages," while UGO suggested that Kitana and her mother Sindel should be on every "hot females in videogames" list. Kitana and Mileena were included among the "old-school hotties that still got it" by Travis Hubert of Cheat Code Central in 2014, who stated that "these two have become synonymous with the sex appeal of the Mortal Kombat series [and] even surpassed the popularity of Sonya Blade, who was the original MK hottie." Placing her 19th in their 2015 ranking of the series' 73 playable characters, Den of Geek opined "Kitana became one of the breakout stars of the series, easily having more meat on her character than Sonya ever did."

Kitana has also often shared the media spotlight with Mileena and Jade; GameFront's Phil Owen considered them all "basically the same character." At the time of the release of MKII, The Miami Herald called Kitana and Mileena ("leggy ladies who wear masks") to be "an interesting step toward political correctness" as "a far cry from Little Miss Muffet". Brazilian magazine Ação Games placed her and Mileena at the eight spot on their list of "Top Girls" in 1997. In a retrospective article from 2011, IGN's Richard George listed "the hot chicks" as one of the reasons why Mortal Kombat II "is considered by many to be the pinnacle of the series." Alongside Mileena and Jade, Kitana was included on the list of the "hottest chicks of 2011" by Univision. The three of them all shared a spot on the 2014 list of top ten "hottest" female villains in gaming by Cheat Code Central's Travis Huber. In 2009, GamePros Aaron Koehn ranked Mileena and Kitana as the 11th-best pair of palette-swapped video game characters, writing that "both prefer wearing clothing that shows off their inflated mammary glands, and both have used the usually endearing gesture of kissing as a fatality." The two were featured in GamesRadar's 2006 list of top seven "girls kissing girls", and "Kitana's and Mileena's deadly kisses" were chosen as the favourite Fatalities by Retro Gamer Paul Drury in 2007. Lauren Alessandra of GamingUnion.net wrote that Kitana "easily fits in" the number six spot on her 2011 list of top video game heroines, stating that "her and her 'clone' sister for that matter quickly became poster girls for the series." In 2012, UGO similarly described "the busty ninja sisters Kitana and Mileena" as the front characters of the Mortal Kombat franchise. Kitana was voted at second place in the Mortal Kombat category of "Miss of Video Games 2012" by Polish magazine PSX Extreme, where she ultimately lost to Jade. In 2014, Zoomin.TV ranked Kitana second among their 2015 "top five sexiest Mortal Kombat girls" which also included Jade as well as Skarlet. Playboy included Mileena, Kitana, and Jade together among "the hottest video game breasts of all time".

Kitana was listed among the 25 "hottest (and deadliest) ninja assassin chicks" in all media by UGO in 2011 for having "brains and brawn, not to mention a wardrobe full of sparse clothing." Complex editors pitted the "as deadly as she is beautiful" Kitana against Taki from the Soulcalibur series for the 2011 "battle of the beauties" in the category "female ninjas", which resulted in a draw between the two, and ranked Kitana as the tenth-top female killer from video games in 2012, noting that "she is still holding down her spot on the hot female assassins list" nearly two decades after her debut. Gelo Gonzales of FHM listed Kitana as one of the nine "sexiest ninja babes in games" in 2012, comparing her to Eula Valdez. Márcio Pacheco Alexsandro of GameHall placed Kitana and Mileena at second spot of his 2014 list of top ten female ninja characters in games. In 2017, GameRant ranked her as the fifth best ninja character of Mortal Kombat, stating she should be just "written off as 'Mileena Lite'" and calling her fans the perhaps most iconic weapon in the series.

Gender criticism and Fatalities

There have been controversies and mixed or negative critical reception of the character. In 1994, she was one of the fighting game characters cited by Guy Aoki of AsianWeek as allegedly perpetuating existing stereotypes of Asians as martial arts experts. In the video game violence controversy themed book Interacting With Video, Patricia Marks Greenfield and Rodney R. Cocking used the "two Asian twin sisters, Kitana and Mileena" as an example of "highly eroticized Dragon Lady" stereotyping in video games. When Marsha Kinder accused Mortal Kombat II of misogyny in its handling of female characters, she alleged that "some of the most violent possibilities are against women," whose own "fatality moves are highly eroticised." Patrick Sunnen's book Making Sense of Video Games judged their portrayal as "formidable female opponents" to be potentially progressive, yet arguably made just to increase "the sexist potential of the individual fights", and described Kitana's Fatality of decapitation with a "deceptively feminine razor-sharp fan" to be castration-like. Chad Hunter of Complex chose Jade and Kitana to represent the "women who fight" stereotype in his 2012 list of the fifteen most stereotypical characters in video games, for being "half-naked skanks who can fight, hurl lasers and perform aerobatic attacks while wearing thongs, high-heeled boots and keeping their giant breasts under scarves," claiming that this has caused "female gamers [to] slide away from this series." In a satire article "Mortal Kombat II warriors: Where are they now?" by VentureBeat's Jason Lomberg, Kitana "joined the National Organization for Women and started an online campaign to recognize and combat the rampant sexual harassment in organized death tournaments. Mai Shiranui, Cammy, Morrigan, and Mileena all stepped forward to share their stories."

Kitana's finishing moves have been critically received variably but mostly positively, especially in regards to her famous signature "Kiss of Death". Featuring her in their "Girls of Gaming" special in 2003, play cited this Fatality as the aspect of Kitana that she is famous for. Her death kiss was ranked as the eighth-best of all Mortal Kombat Fatalities by both UGO in 2007 and IGN in 2010.Jack DeVries, "IGN's Unofficial Top 10 List of the Best Mortal Kombat Fatalities", IGN, November 30, 2010. In 2011, GameFront's Ben Richardson ranked it as the second best finishing move in the series for being "just icing on the cake" for MKI'''s combination of gore and dark comedy, echoing Ed Boon's opinion. as the 18th top Mortal Kombat finishing move by Kevin Wong of Complex that same year, and as the eighth-best Fatality by Robert Workman of Prima Games in 2014, as well as included among the deadliest kisses in all of science fiction and fantasy by Gordon Jackson from io9 in 2015. Javy Gwaltney of Paste Magazine put Kitana's kiss from MKII third on his 2015 list of "the 15 most memorable Fatalities in Mortal Kombat", which also included Kitana cutting an opponent into pieces in MKX, commenting it is "of little surprise that Princess Kitana is a long-time Mortal Kombat fan favorite" as her finishing moves "are consistently fantastic." However, Kitana's kiss was also included on the list of the series' seven worst Fatalities by Dan Ryckert of Game Informer in 2010, and C.J. Smillie of Game Rant ranked it as the series' eighth-worst Fatality in 2011, criticizing it for not innovating enough over the years and stating that this "unoriginality...really hurts Kitana's standing in the series." In another article, Smillie ranked Kitana's new "Splitting Headache" Fatality from MK2011 placed as the eighth best finishing move in this game. Back in 1996, her rabbit Animality was also singled out as especially "weak and poorly conceived" in GamePro's review of Ultimate Mortal Kombat 3.

Other reception
In various articles, often being tongue-in-cheek, Soren Bowie of Mania.com listed Kitana as one of ten "psychotic video game chicks with too much baggage," GameDaily featured her as one of ten "babes who shouldn't meet your mom," GamesRadar's Alan Bradley included her among "gaming's most twisted royalty" for having "a thing for bloody decapitations via razor fan and for boys 9,000 years her junior," and Jim Sterling of Destructoid expressed his discomfort at Kitana's design in MK Vs. DCU, implying her bulging crotch made her look like a transvestite. Leah Jackson from MTV's The Feed instead paired her with Kung Lao instead of Liu Kang, as he "would offer great balance to Princess Kitana's often hectic lifestyle" of "always going off getting killed, resurrected, put under spells, or whatever new kind of hell is cooked up for her." The character's outfits were parodied in Grey Carter's "Critical Miss" comic strip at The Escapist, where Kitana is forced to wear skimpy costumes and high heels by her stepfather.GamePros AJ Glasser called Kitana her favorite female Mortal Kombat character, but nevertheless criticized the character's pre-reboot repertoire of special moves. Ben Kendrick of Game Rant included Kitana in his 2011 list of ten "most awesome" Mortal Kombat characters in the "honorable mentions" section, but added that "apart from possessing one of the cooler weapons" in the game, she "lacks the entertaining/alluring oddity" of Mileena. GameFront's Richardson opined that, Kitana's "most amusing" kiss-killing aside, she has "not [been a very compelling character." Some were much more dismissive of the character altogether. For instance, Game Informer listed her among the palette swapped ninja characters not wanted by them in the future Mortal Kombat games in 2010, and Kotaku's Mike Fahey wrote that "the whole alien ninja woman thing" was not "quite my cup of tea." Reacting to one fan request to not "waste a character slot" on Kitana in MKX, Ed Boon himself commented: "How can  hate on Kitana?"

The alternative versions of the character in other media have been variably received. At the time of the release, some film critics such as Laura Evenson of San Francisco Chronicle or Eric D. Snider noted Talisa Soto's attractiveness in the role of Kitana but found her character otherwise uninteresting as compared to Robin Shou's Liu Kang. Michael Saunders of The Boston Globe opined "Soto never seems to do much more other than look exotic in the role," which Ben Steelman of Star-News described as "basically Princess Leia in black leotards," and Malcolm Johnson of the Hartford Courant described Kitana in Annihilation as wearing "a knockout black leather costume [that] gives her the look of the world's sweetest dominatrix." albeit Destructoid's Sterling included Kitana among the first film's "more sensible makeovers" comparing them to how X-Men comics characters were redesigned for the film adaptations. Dimas Sanfiorenzo of Complex ranked the animated Kitana in Defenders of the Realm as 18th on the list of "hottest cartoon women of all time" in 2011, while the feature film version of Kitana was ranked fourth on the list of "hottest women in video game movies" by Peter Rubin of Complex, with a likeness score of 70%. The Legacy episode "Kitana & Mileena" was nominated by the Writers Guild of America Award in the category "Outstanding Achievement in Writing Derivative New Media".

See also
Ninja in popular culture

Notes

References

External links

Action film characters
Adoptee characters in video games
Emperor and empress characters in video games
Extraterrestrial characters in video games
Female characters in comics
Female characters in video games
Female video game villains
Fictional martial artists in video games
Fictional Baguazhang practitioners
Fictional Ying Zhao Pai practitioners
Fictional assassins in video games
Fictional bojutsuka
Fictional characters with post-traumatic stress disorder
Fictional female assassins
Fictional female martial artists
Fictional female ninja
Fictional polearm and spearfighters
Fictional slaves in video games
Fictional tessenjutsuka
Mortal Kombat characters
Ninja characters in video games
Orphan characters in video games
Princess characters in video games
Science fantasy video game characters
Twin characters in video games
Video game bosses
Video game characters introduced in 1993
Video game characters who can teleport
Video game protagonists
Woman soldier and warrior characters in video games
Zombie and revenant characters in video games